

Paleozoology

Conodont paleozoology 
German paleontologist Klaus J. Müller (1923-2010) described the conodont order Paraconodontida.

Vertebrates

Dinosaurs

Newly named dinosaurs 
Data courtesy of George Olshevsky's dinosaur genera list.

Birds

Newly named birds

References

 
1960s in paleontology